Elaphromyia incompleta is a species of tephritid or fruit flies in the genus Elaphromyia of the family Tephritidae.

Distribution
China, Japan.

References

Tephritinae
Insects described in 1933
Diptera of Asia